Life Somewhere Else is a 1995 short documentary film directed by Walter Salles. It tells the story of Maria do Socorro Nobre, a Brazilian woman who, while serving a 20-year prison sentence, becomes inspired by the story of Polish artist Frans Krajcberg, and becomes pen pals with him.

Krajcberg himself co-wrote the film with director Walter Salles.

References

External links

1995 films
1995 documentary films
1995 short films
Brazilian short documentary films
1990s Portuguese-language films
1990s short documentary films
Black-and-white documentary films
Films directed by Walter Salles
Documentary films about the penal system